Kwen Liew is a Malaysian chef of classic French cuisine in Paris, France.

Early life 
Liew was born in Kuala Lumpur and grew up in Malaysia.

Education 
Liew attended Le Cordon Bleu for cuisine courses in Australia and Thailand. Liew attended Ecole Nationale Supérieure de Pâtisserie in France to learn French pastry.

Career 
Liew started her career as an intern chef at Antoine in Paris, France. Liew became a chef at Le Saint Julien in Singapore. As a French cuisine chef, Liew has worked in top restaurants in Australia, Thailand, Singapore and France.

In March 2017, Liew opened Pertinence Restaurant with her partner Ryunosuke Naito in Paris, France. It serves classic French cuisine with Japanese technique.
In 2018, Liew became the first Malaysian woman to win a Michelin star. Liew is one of the two woman chef out of 57 whom received a Michelin star in 2018.  Liew is the co-owner of Pertinence Restaurant with her husband in Paris.

Personal life 
Liew's partner is Ryunosuke Naito, a chef.

See also 
 List of female chefs with Michelin stars

References

Head chefs of Michelin starred restaurants
Living people
Women chefs
Malaysian chefs
Year of birth missing (living people)
People from Kuala Lumpur